Zelman is a surname, and may refer to:

 People
 Alberto Zelman (1874–1927), Australian musician and conductor
 Daniel Zelman (born 1967), American actor, screenwriter and television producer
Kathleen Zelman, American nutritionist, dietitian and writer

See also 
 Zelman Symphony, Melbourne, Australia
 Zelman v. Simmons-Harris United States Supreme Court case
 Zelman (the given name)
 Selman
 Selmann (given name)

Surnames